Hairanwala Kalan is a village in Wazirabad Tehsil, in the Gujranwala District of Punjab, Pakistan. The numberdar of this village is Gulam Rasool Cheema.

References 

Villages in Gujranwala District
Populated places in Wazirabad Tehsil